K.V. Akshara is a director, playwright and writer in the Kannada language. He is the son of the writer K.V. Subbanna. He is a prominent figure in contemporary Kannada theatre.

Akshara presently heads Ninasam, the theatre group and cultural complex in Heggodu, Karnataka, founded by his father. He is also the treasurer of "Ninasam" society.

Early life and education
After attending primary education at Heggodu village and Sagar town, he studied theatre at National School of Drama, New Delhi and at Workshop Theatre, University of Leeds in the United Kingdom.

Awards and recognitions
Sangeet Natak Akademi award
Karnataka Sahitya Academy award
Karnataka Nataka Academy fellowship

Publications
K.V. Akshara has written more than 15 books in Kannada on Drama, theatre and performing arts and translated books on theatre to Kannada language. He has also translated  and directed dramas written by William Shakespeare.

Cinemada Yantrabhase, 1981 (with K V Subbanna)
Ranga Aveeshane, 1982
Hadiharayada Hadugalu, 1985
Rangabhoomiya Mukhaanatra, 2008, 2010
Ranga Prapancha, 2010
Swayamvaraloka
Sahyadri Kanda

References

Kannada-language writers
Dramatists and playwrights from Karnataka
Indian theatre directors
Year of birth missing (living people)
Living people
People from Shimoga district
Kannada people
Kannada dramatists and playwrights
Indian male dramatists and playwrights
20th-century Indian dramatists and playwrights
20th-century Indian male writers